Nikola Vasilev Ivanov-Sheikha (Bulgarian: Никола Иванов; born 11 August 1988) is a Bulgarian footballer who plays for Oborishte Panagyurishte as a midfielder. In his first spell with Oborishte, he was the club captain.

Notes 

1988 births
Living people
Bulgarian footballers
Association football midfielders
First Professional Football League (Bulgaria) players
Second Professional Football League (Bulgaria) players
FC Sportist Svoge players
PFC Pirin Gotse Delchev players
FC Oborishte players
FC Lokomotiv 1929 Sofia players
FC Hebar Pazardzhik players